The Hirz Fire was a wildfire that burned near Lakehead, California in the Shasta National Forest. The fire was burning only a few miles from the enormous Carr Fire, the sixth-most destructive fire in California history. On September 10, the growing Delta Fire burned into the western perimeter of the Hirz Fire.

Timeline
The fire began on August 9, 2018.

The fire continued to burn through August 2018. On August 13, 2018, the Hirz Fire had burned  and was 5% contained.

The Hirz Fire continued to grow in size, eventually reaching  by early September 2018. Afterward, fire growth stopped, while firefighters made significant progress on containing the fire. On September 10, the growing Delta Fire burned into the western perimeter of the Hirz Fire.

See also 
2018 California wildfires
Carr Fire
Delta Fire

References 

2018 California wildfires
Wildfires in Shasta County, California